Virginia Louisa Minor (March 27, 1824 – August 14, 1894) was an American women's suffrage activist.  She is best remembered as the plaintiff in Minor v. Happersett, an 1875 United States Supreme Court case in which Minor unsuccessfully argued that the Fourteenth Amendment to the United States Constitution gave women the right to vote.

Life
Minor was born in Caroline County, Virginia on March 27, 1824.

Minor married her distant cousin, lawyer Francis Minor, in 1843; they settled in St. Louis in 1844.  During the American Civil War, Minor was an active member of the St. Louis Ladies' Union Aid Society.

In 1867, Minor co-founded and became the first president of the Woman's Suffrage Association of Missouri (later an affiliate of the American Woman Suffrage Association). The Women's Suffrage Association of Missouri was the first organization created with the specific aim of enfranchising women. Minor personally sided with the National Woman's Suffrage Association, prompting her resignation as President of the Missouri Association.  At an 1869 convention in St. Louis, Minor stated that "the Constitution of the United States gives me every right and privilege to which every other citizen is entitled."  Later that year, Francis and Virginia Minor drafted and circulated pamphlets arguing for women's suffrage based on the newly passed Fourteenth Amendment.

On October 15, 1872, Virginia Minor attempted to register to vote in St. Louis.  When election registrar Reese Happersett turned her down, Virginia (represented by Francis) filed suit in the Missouri state courts.  The trial court, Missouri Supreme Court, and United States Supreme Court all ruled in favor of the state of Missouri.  The Supreme Court unanimously held "that the Constitution of the United States does not confer the right of suffrage upon any one", and that the decision of who should be entitled to vote was left to the legislative branch.

Virginia Minor testified in support of women's suffrage before the United States Senate in 1889, and was honorary vice president of the Interstate Woman Suffrage Convention in 1892.  She died in St. Louis in 1894 and is buried at Bellefontaine Cemetery.

Legacy
In December 2013 Minor was announced as an inductee to the Hall of Famous Missourians. Her bronze bust will be one of forty-four on permanent display in the Missouri State Capitol in Jefferson City.

Minor was named an honoree of the National Women's History Alliance in 2020.

See also
History of women's suffrage in the United States
Nineteenth Amendment to the United States Constitution
List of suffragists and suffragettes
Timeline of women's suffrage

References

External links

1824 births
1894 deaths
American suffragists
People from St. Louis
American tax resisters
People from Caroline County, Virginia
Activists from Missouri
Activists from Virginia
Missouri suffrage
Minor family